The 12th Golden Laurel Awards (also known as 2001 Golden Laurel Awards), honoring the best film and television producers of 2000, were held at The Century Plaza Hotel in Los Angeles, California on March 3, 2001. The nominees were announced on January 10, 2001.

Winners and nominees

Film
{| class=wikitable style="width="100%"
|-
! colspan="2" style="background:#abcdef;"| Darryl F. Zanuck Award for Outstanding Producer of Theatrical Motion Pictures
|-
| colspan="2" style="vertical-align:top;"|
 Gladiator – Branko Lustig and Douglas Wick Almost Famous
 Billy Elliot
 Crouching Tiger, Hidden Dragon
 Erin Brockovich
|}

Television

David O. Selznick Lifetime Achievement Award in Theatrical Motion PicturesBrian GrazerDavid Susskind Lifetime Achievement Award in Television
 David E. KelleyMilestone AwardKirk DouglasNew Media AwardBruce LeakNew Technology AwardSidney LumetNova Award for Most Promising Producer
Theatrical Motion Pictures: Greg Brenman and Jonathan Finn for Billy Elliot
Television: Linwood Boomer for Malcolm in the Middle

PGA Hall of Fame
Theatrical Motion Pictures: It Happened One Night and Lawrence of Arabia
Television: The Andy Griffith Show and The Honeymooners

Vision Award
Theatrical Motion Pictures: Fantasia 2000
Television: CSI: Crime Scene Investigation

References

 2000
2000 film awards
2000 television awards
2000 guild awards